José Jabardo Zaragoza (3 February 1915 - 12 April 1986) was a Spanish professional road racing cyclist. He won a stage of the 1942 Vuelta a España, which was only professional victory. He also finished third overall in the previous edition of the race.

Major results
1941
 2nd Overall Vuelta a Navarra
 3rd Overall Vuelta a España
1942
 3rd Subida al Naranco
 6th Overall Vuelta a España
1st Stage 3

References

External links

1915 births
1986 deaths
Spanish male cyclists
Spanish Vuelta a España stage winners
Sportspeople from the Province of Guadalajara
Cyclists from Castilla-La Mancha